Eastgate is a residential area, immediately to the east of Peterborough Cathedral and west of Fengate, in the unparished area of Peterborough, in the Peterborough district, in the ceremonial county of Cambridgeshire, England. For electoral purposes it forms part of Peterborough Central ward.

Bishop Creighton County Primary School is located in the area; following the closure of nearby Hereward Community College in July 2007, secondary pupils attend the Thomas Deacon Academy which opened in September 2007.

Suburbs of Peterborough